Sandown Castle may refer to:
Sandown Castle, Kent
Sandown Castle, Isle of Wight